Saint Andrew North Western is a parliamentary constituency represented in the House of Representatives of the Jamaican Parliament. It elects one Member of Parliament MP by the first past the post system of election. It has been represented by Nigel A. L. Clarke since a by-election in 2018.

Members 

 Derrick C. Smith (until 2018)

Boundaries 

Covers Havendale and Hughenden.

References

Parliamentary constituencies of Jamaica